Leichardtia is a plant genus in the family Apocynaceae, first described as a genus in 1849. It is native to Australia, New Caledonia, and Fiji.

Species
 Leichardtia billardieri (Decne.) Bullock - New Caledonia
 Leichardtia ericoides (Schltr.) Bullock - New Caledonia
 Leichardtia leptophylla (F.Muell. ex Benth.) Bullock 	- Australia
 Leichardtia stenophylla (A. Gray) A.C. Sm. - Fiji

formerly included
Leichardtia australis R.Br. synonym of  Marsdenia australis (R. Br.) Druce

References

External links 

Asclepiadoideae
Apocynaceae genera